William John Stephenson Tallon RVM (12 November 1935 – 23 November 2007), also known as Billy Tallon or Backstairs Billy, was a steward and member of the Queen Mother's staff at Clarence House.

Early life
Tallon was born above his grandfather's hardware shop in Birtley, County Durham, in 1935. A year later, the family had fallen on hard times, and moved to Coventry, where Tallon grew up in Norman Place Road in Coundon. He attended Barkers Butts Secondary Modern School. After he left school, he began training with a jeweller in Leamington Spa. The day he was to begin his apprenticeship, Tallon, then residing in Keresley, received a letter from the Controller of the Household, with a form to be completed and a travel warrant to Buckingham Palace. Having always shown an interest in the Royal Family, his book of press cuttings on King George VI and Queen Elizabeth was his greatest treasure. He enthusiastically followed the family's 1947 South African tour.

Work with the Royal Family
Tallon's first job in the Royal Household was as a junior assistant, at Easter Court at Windsor in 1951, at age 15. He had been writing letters asking for work with the Household for the previous five years. He was later employed at Buckingham Palace. He was set to join Queen Elizabeth II on her Commonwealth tour in 1953-1954 but was kept back and did his National Service with the RAF. Subsequently, he asked Queen Elizabeth The Queen Mother if he could join the staff at her home, Clarence House. She agreed, and he remained with her until her death. In 1978, Tallon succeeded Walter Taylor as Steward and Page of the Backstairs. He would thus earn the tabloid nickname "Backstairs Billy". Tallon was on duty from early in the morning until the Queen Mother went to bed; he entered her private rooms without knocking, and bought the Christmas presents which she gave to others.

Tallon's partner of over 30 years was Reginald Wilcock, who had become a footman at Buckingham Palace in 1954. Wilcock was a valet to the Duke of Windsor in Paris from 1957 to 1959, before joining the Queen Mother's staff at Clarence House in 1960 as a footman. He had been the House Deputy Steward and the Queen Mother's Page of the Presence since 1978. On 4 August 2000, Wilcock served the Queen Mother her 100th birthday morning tea in her room. That night, at the Royal Opera House in Covent Garden, Tallon learnt that Wilcock was dying.  A week later, on 11 August, Wilcock died, aged 66. Tallon arranged a "magnificent" funeral for him at the Queen's Chapel in Marlborough House.

After Wilcock's death, Tallon reportedly suffered from depression. He reportedly felt "sidelined" when the Queen Mother turned to a younger team of staff for her nursing care. However, when she died in 2002, at the age of 101, Tallon was said to be heartbroken. Following this, Tallon left Clarence House, where he had lived in the Lodge house. He settled in a ground-floor flat with a garden in Kennington, south east London, where he was found dead on 23 November 2007, aged 72, as a result of liver failure. Tallon's funeral took place at the Queen's Chapel in St James's Palace, with readings from Sir Derek Jacobi and Patricia Routledge. The funeral was attended by more than 200 people, including the Earl of Snowdon, Lady Sarah Chatto, June Brown, Paul O'Grady, Phyllida Law, Sir Roy Strong, Roy Petley and Keith Barron.

In 2014, Buckingham Palace reacted angrily to suggestions made in The Royal Life of William Tallon, a biography of Tallon written by Tom Quinn, that the Queen Mother "was frequently drunk and "dotty" for the final 20 years of her life." The Queen Mother's niece and former lady-in-waiting, Margaret Rhodes, denied that the Queen Mother drank gin and tonic, claiming that she favoured a "gin martini mix which she usually made herself".

Media
A Channel 4 documentary, Backstairs Billy: The Queen Mum's Butler, was broadcast in 2009.

Awards
Tallon was awarded the Royal Victorian Medal in Silver in 1996. He was one of the few holders of the medal in Gold, the highest award in the lowest grade of the Royal Victorian Order. He was awarded the Gold medal in June 2001, having received his 50-year Service Clasp earlier that year.

References

External links

Tallon obituary, The Times Online

1935 births
2007 deaths
British servants
English LGBT people
People from Birtley, Tyne and Wear
People from Kennington
Recipients of the Royal Victorian Medal
Members of the British Royal Household
20th-century LGBT people